"Her Royal Majesty" is a song written by Gerry Goffin and Carole King and performed by James Darren.  The song was arranged and produced by Stu Phillips.

It reached #6 on the U.S. pop chart and #36 on the UK Singles Chart in 1962. The song ranked #80 on Billboard magazine's Top 100 singles of 1962.

Background
This song is considered a sequel to Darren's previous hit song "Goodbye Cruel World" (1961). It's about a sad man, who had lost his love, becoming the king of fools, to her royal majesty. The Music is in the style of a British music Hall number, with a brass and wind section, plus a snare drum rhythm, playing royal coronation music. The song begins with a drum roll, with Darren announcing: "Ladies and Gentlemen: Presenting her Royal Majesty".

Chart performance

Other versions
Lee Dorsey released a version of the song on the 1992 album various artists album Million Dollar Hits.

References

1962 songs
1962 singles
Lee Dorsey songs
James Darren songs
Songs with lyrics by Gerry Goffin
Songs written by Carole King